The 1929 Giro d'Italia was the 17th edition of the Giro d'Italia, organized and sponsored by the newspaper La Gazzetta dello Sport. The race was won by the Alfredo Binda of the Legnano team. Second and third respectively were the Italian riders Domenico Piemontesi and Leonida Frascarelli.

Participants

Of the 166 riders that began the Giro d'Italia on 19 May, 99 of them made it to the finish in Milan on 9 June. Riders were allowed to ride on their own or as a member of a team. There were eight teams that competed in the race: Bianchi-Pirelli, Gloria-Hutchinson, Ideor-Pirelli, Legnano-Hutchinson, Maino-Clément, Prina-Pirelli, Touring-Pirelli, and Wolsit-Hutchinson.

The peloton was primarily composed of Italians. Alfredo Binda, a three-time winner and reigning champion, came in as the favorite to win the race. Outside of Binda, the field featured only one other Giro d'Italia winner in Gaetano Belloni who won the 1920 running. Other notable Italian riders that started the race included Giuseppe Pancera, Antonio Negrini, and Domenico Piemontesi.

Final standings

Stage results

General classification

There were 99 cyclists who had completed all fourteen stages. For these cyclists, the times they had needed in each stage was added up for the general classification. The cyclist with the least accumulated time was the winner.

Junior rider classification

Independent rider classification

References

Footnotes

Citations

Bibliography

1929
Giro d'Italia
Giro d'Italia
Giro d'Italia
Giro d'Italia